Zygaena cambysea is a moth of the family Zygaenidae. It is found in the Middle East, including Iran. It is rosy-red like cuvieri, but differs in the body being entirely black, without red collar and belt. In the form rosacea Rom. from Armenia the spots of the forewing are so merged that the wings appear almost evenly carmine.

Subspecies
Zygaena cambysea cambysea (Iran)
Zygaena cambysea kamarana
Zygaena cambysea hafis Reiss, 1938 (Iran)

References

External links
Images representing Zygaena cambysea at Bold

Zygaena
Moths of the Middle East
Moths described in 1870